zalagasper (formerly Zala Kralj & Gašper Šantl) is a Slovenian musical duo from Maribor consisting of vocalist Zala Kralj and multi-instrumentalist Gašper Šantl. The duo represented Slovenia in the Eurovision Song Contest 2019 with the song "Sebi", finishing 15th (out of 26 entrants) in the final. The duo formed in 2018 after Kralj had begun performing vocals on some songs written and produced by Šantl. Initially, Kralj was only credited as a featured artist. They released the singles "Valovi", "Baloni", and "S teboi" in 2018, before releasing their debut extended play Štiri in February 2019.

Members
 Zala Kralj – vocals, sampler
 Gašper Šantl – guitar, sampler, production

Discography

Studio albums

Extended plays

Singles

Music videos

Awards and nominations

Notes

References

External links

Electronic music duos
Eurovision Song Contest entrants of 2019
Eurovision Song Contest entrants for Slovenia
Slovenian electronic music groups
Slovenian pop music groups
Slovenian songwriters
Universal Music Group artists